The Big Food Group was a food retail and wholesale company based in the UK. It was created in 2000 when the supermarket chain Iceland merged with Booker Cash & Carry plc.

The company was purchased by Icelandic retail consortium Baugur Group in 2005, and split into:
 Retail: Iceland
 Wholesale: Booker Cash & Carry
 Foodservices: Woodward Foodservice
 Logistics: Expert Logistics

The property portfolio was spun out into a separate company called PropCo, for £213 million, and then leased back.

References

External links 
The Big Food Group – site now defunct
Iceland supermarket
Booker Cash & Carry

Catering and food service companies of the United Kingdom
Companies formerly listed on the London Stock Exchange
Wholesalers of the United Kingdom